Daeng Sanusi bin Daeng Mariok is a Malaysian politician who has served as Member of the Dewan Rakyat for Rantau Panjang since 1990 to 1999. He is a member of PAS, a component party of the ruling Perikatan Nasional (PN) coalition at both federal and state levels. At the party level, he is the Chairman of PAS Central Disciplinary Committee, former PAS Johor Executive Board, and former PAS Vice President.

Election results

References

Living people
1938 births
People from Johor
Malaysian people of Bugis descent
Malaysian Muslims
Malaysian Islamic Party politicians
Members of the Dewan Rakyat